Several Canadian and international films are set in Toronto. Although a number of films are shot in Toronto, not every film uses Toronto as its setting. Films shot in Toronto that do not use the city as its setting are not included in the following list.

List of films
List of films set in Toronto include:

See also

 List of films based on location

Notes

References

External links 

The Toronto Film Map - Map of full-length feature films or television shows set in Toronto, indicating availability at University of Toronto Libraries and Toronto Public Library

Toronto
Films set in Toronto